Abrar Alvi (1 July 1927 – 18 November 2009) was an Indian film writer, director and actor. Most of his notable work was done in the 1950s and 1960s with Guru Dutt. He wrote some of the most respected works of Indian cinema, including Sahib Bibi Aur Ghulam, Kaagaz Ke Phool and Pyaasa, which have an avid following the world over. Pyaasa is included in the All-Time 100 Movies by Time magazine, as chosen by critics Richard Corliss and Richard Schickel.

Works
An integral part of the Guru Dutt team, he is noted for writing such films as Aar-Paar, Sahib Bibi Aur Ghulam, Kaagaz Ke Phool, Pyaasa and Mr. & Mrs. '55. In a chance meeting with Guru Dutt on sets of Baaz in 1953, Guru Dutt was having problems with a scene in the movie and Abrar suggested his opinion. Guru Dutt was so impressed that he invited Abrar to write Aar-Paar, after which Abrar became an integral part of the Guru Dutt team. Many of the movies he worked on for Guru Dutt have since become classics, not only in India, but the world over. He also directed the box office hit Sahib Bibi Aur Ghulam. He last appeared on a poignant three-part documentary on Guru Dutt, reminiscing on his work and days with the Guru Dutt team. The documentary was produced by Channel 4 and is included in the extra features section of Kaagaz Ke Phool  and Chaudhvin ka Chand DVDs as well.  After his association with Guru Dutt and due to controversy regarding who actually directed Sahib Bibi Aur Ghulam, he was unable to give any notable directorial work. Abrar, however, continued to pen screenplay and dialogue for several movies, some of these were hits, such as Professor, Prince etc.

Sahib Bibi Aur Ghulam controversy
Sahib Bibi Aur Ghulam was important for Guru Dutt. Following the box-office disaster of Kaagaz Ke Phool, he lost almost 1.7 million on the movie. Guru Dutt needed a success to put him back on the map. The film went on to become a major box office success of the year. The film also won the president's silver medal and the 'Film of the Year' Award from the Bengal Film Journalist Association. The film was also screened at the Berlin Film Festival in June 1963 and was India's official entry to the Oscars that year.

The controversy about who actually directed Sahib Bibi Aur Ghulam has increased over the years. Since the film is characteristic of Guru Dutt's feel and style, it is difficult to think that he did not direct the film. However, Guru Dutt never denied Abrar Alvi's role in the film, nor did he make any counter-claims when Alvi won the Filmfare Award for Best Director for the film. Abrar Alvi has stated that Guru Dutt did direct the songs in the film, but not the film in its entirety. The editor of the film Y.G. Chawan says that for the film, it was Abrar who sat with him. To quote him: "Abrar worked so hard on that film but he never got any credit. People say it was produced by Guru Dutt so it had to be Guru Dutt's film."

Awards
 Won – 10th National Film Awards (1962): President's Silver Medal for Best Feature Film in Hindi – Sahib Bibi Aur Ghulam
 Won – Filmfare Award for Best Director for: Sahib Bibi Aur Ghulam (1962)

Death
Abrar Alvi died due to a stomach complication on Wednesday, 18 November 2009 in Mumbai. He was 82 years old.

Select filmography

Writer

 Guddu (1995) (dialogue) (screenplay)
 Kasam Suhaag Ki (1989) (dialogue)
 Patthar Dil (1985) (dialogue) (screenplay)
 Khuda Kasam (1981) (dialogue) (screenplay)
 Biwi-O-Biwi: The Fun-Film (1981) (dialogue)
 Hamare Tumhare (1979) (dialogue) (screenplay)
 Sabse Bada Rupaiya (1976) (dialogues) (screenplay)
 Bairaag (1976) (dialogue)
 Laila Majnu (1976) (dialogue)
 Manoranjan (1974) (written by)
 Saathi (1968) (dialogue)
 Sunghursh (1968) (dialogue)
 Chhotisi Mulaqat (1967) (dialogue)
 Suraj (1966) (dialogue)
 Baharen Phir Bhi Aayengi (1966) (written by)
 Professor (1962) (dialogue) (screenplay)
 Sahib Bibi Aur Ghulam (1962) (dialogue)
 Chaudhvin Ka Chand (1960)
 Kaagaz Ke Phool (1959) (dialogue) (screenplay)
 Pyaasa (1957) (dialogue)
 Mr. & Mrs. '55 (1955) (dialogue)
 Aar-Paar (1954) (dialogue)

Actor
 Laila Majnu (1976) – (Guest Appearance)
 12 O'Clock (1958) – Police Inspector

Director
 Sahib Bibi Aur Ghulam (1962)
 Darar (Serial Screenplay)

See also
 :Category:Films with screenplays by Abrar Alvi

References

Further reading
 Ten Years with Guru Dutt: Abrar Alvi's journey, by Sathya Saran. 2008, Penguin, .

External links
 
 A newsreport on Sathya Saran's book Ten Years With Guru Dutt

20th-century Indian film directors
Indian male screenwriters
Indian male film actors
2009 deaths
Hindi-language film directors
Male actors in Hindi cinema
1927 births
20th-century Indian male actors
Place of birth missing
Film directors from Mumbai
Male actors from Mumbai
Filmfare Awards winners
20th-century Indian screenwriters
20th-century Indian male writers